Döderlein may refer to:

People
 Johann Christoph Döderlein (1745–1792), theologian at Jena
 Johann Christoph Wilhelm Ludwig Döderlein (1791–1863), philologist
 Ludwig Heinrich Philipp Döderlein (1855–1936), zoologist and paleontologist
 Albert Döderlein, obstetrician and gynecologist

Other uses
"Döderlein", a song by Norwegian rock group Seigmen on the album Total

Surnames of German origin